Senadolice is a small settlement between Senadole and Štorje in the Municipality of Sežana in the Littoral region of Slovenia.

References

External links

Senadolice on Geopedia

Populated places in the Municipality of Sežana